Baird is a common surname of primarily Scottish origins.

A–L
 Absalom Baird (1824–1905), American general for the Union Army in the Civil War
 Allard Baird (born 1961), American baseball executive
 Andrew Baird (disambiguation), several people
 Andy Baird (born 1979), Scottish footballer
 Archie Baird (1919–2009), Scottish footballer
 Bill Baird (disambiguation), several people
 Boydson H. Baird (1912–2010), American college basketball coach
 Brian Baird (born 1956), American politician
 Briny Baird (born 1972), American professional golfer
 Bruce Baird (born 1942), Australian politician, father of Mike and Julia Baird
 Charles Baird (disambiguation), several people
 Chris Baird (born 1982), Northern Irish footballer, currently playing as a defender for Fulham F.C.
 Craig Baird (born 1972), New Zealand-born race car driver
 Dan Baird (born 1953), American musician and member of The Georgia Satellites
 David Baird (disambiguation), several people
 Des Baird (1888–1947), Australian rules footballer
 Diora Baird (born 1983), American actress and model
 Donna Baird, American epidemiologist and evolutionary-population biologist
 Dorothea Baird (born 1875), English stage and film actress
 Doug Baird (disambiguation), several people
 Sir Dugald Baird (1899–1986), British doctor specializing in obstetrics and fertility
 Duncan Baird (born 1979), member of the Arkansas House of Representatives
 Edgar Baird (1911–2005), Canadian businessman and park ranger, recipient of the Order of Newfoundland and Labrador
 Edith Baird (1859–1924), British chess composer
 Edward Baird (disambiguation), several people
 Francis Baird (1802–1864), engineer and owner of Baird Works
 Frank Baird (1912–2007), American basketball player
 George Baird (disambiguation), several people
 Hal Baird, American college baseball coach
 Harry Baird (disambiguation), several people
 Helen Cowie (doctor) (1875-1956), born Helen Baird, New Zealand doctor 
 Henry Martyn Baird (1832–1906), American historian of the Huguenots
 Hugh Baird (disambiguation), several people
 Isabelle Turcotte Baird (born 1970), Canadian triathlon athlete
 James Baird (disambiguation), several people
 Jeanne Baird, American actress
 Jennifer Baird, British archaeologist and professor
 Jeremy Baird, American drag queen known as Robbie Turner
 John Baird (disambiguation), several people
 John Logie Baird (1888–1946), Inventor of the television
 Joseph E. Baird (1865–1942), American politician from Ohio
 Joyce Baird (1929–2015), British trade unionist
 Joyce Baird (diabetologist) (1929–2014), Scottish diabetes clinician and academic researcher
 Julia Baird (born 1947), half-sister of John Lennon
 Julia Baird (journalist), Australian journalist, daughter of Bruce Baird
 Julianne Baird (born 1952), American soprano
 Kingsley Baird (born 1957), New Zealand sculptor
 LaRoy Baird (1881–1950), American politician
 Leah Baird (1883–1971), silent screen actress and screenwriter
 Leanne Baird, Miss Canada International 1998

M–Z
 Mamie Baird (1925-2012), Scottish journalist and author
 Margarite Frances Baird (1890–1970), artist (aka Peggy Cowley, Peggy Baird, Peggy Johns)
 Matthew Baird (1817–1877), railroad and locomotive businessman
 Michael Baird (footballer) (born 1983), Australian football player
 Mike Baird (born 1968), Australian politician, son of Bruce Baird
 Mike Baird (musician), professional drummer for the band Journey
 Pamela Baird (born 1945), American actress
 Patrick Douglas Baird (1912–1984), Scottish glaciologist
 Rick Baird (born 1974), member of the 2002 U.S. Olympic Bobsled team
 Robert Baird (disambiguation), several people
 Roger Baird (born 1960), Scottish rugby player
 Sam Baird (born 1988), professional snooker player from England
 Sammy Baird, Scottish footballer
 Scott Baird (born 1951), American curler and oldest athlete to ever participate in the Winter Olympics
 Sharon Baird (born 1943), an American actress
 Shiona Baird (born 1946), English politician and former member of the Scottish Parliament
 Spencer Fullerton Baird (1823–1887), American ornithologist and ichthyologist
 Stuart Baird, Academy Award nominated English film editor, producer, and director
 Susan Baird, Labour Party Councillor for the Braidfauld ward of Glasgow, Scotland
 Tadeusz Baird (1928–1981), Polish composer
 Theodore Baird (1901–1996), American professor
 Thomas D. Baird (1819–1873) American educator
 Travis Baird (born 1986), Australian rules footballer
 Vera Baird (born 1951), British politician and barrister
 William Baird (disambiguation), multiple people
 Zoë Baird (born 1952), American lawyer

See also
 François-Auguste Biard (1800–1882), French painter

Scottish surnames
Surnames of Lowland Scottish origin
Anglicised Scottish Gaelic-language surnames
English-language surnames